The Democratic Republic of the Congo Basketball Federation (Febaco) is the governing body for men's and women's basketball in the Democratic Republic of the Congo.  Febaco is an affiliate of FIBA Africa and its offices are located in Kinshasa.  As of 2007 its president is Boni Mwawatadi.

External links
The DRCongo page at Africabasket

Congo
Basketball in the Democratic Republic of the Congo
Sport in Kinshasa